Nybrogade 8 is an 18th-century building overlooking Slotsholmens Kanal and Slotsholmen in central Copenhagen, Denmark. The property comprises the three-storey, half-timbered building at Snaregade 5 on the other side of the block as well as the narrow cobbled courtyard that separates the two buildings. The property was listed in the Danish registry of protected buildings and places in 1945.

History

Early history

The property was listed in Copenhagen's first cadastre of 1689 as No. 5 in Snaren's Quarter and was at that time owned by ropemaker Jens Christensen. The current building at Snaregade 5 was constructed for ropemaker Jørgen Poulsen in 1730–1732. The property was again listed as No. 5 in the new cadastre of 1756 and it was at that timed still owned by Poulsen.

The building towards the canal was constructed in 1768 for butcher Isaac Jonas Gabriel. The property belonged to brewer Lars Møller in the 1770s.

Christian Martfelt (1728–1790), an economist and co-founder of Landøkonomisk Selskab, was among the residents at No. 8 from 1870 to 1773.

Cronberg family
On 9 December 1778, it was acquired by distiller Martinus Henrichsen Cronberg (1721–1786). He had married Maria Andersdatter (c. 1709 – 1781), 28 years his senior, in St. Nicolas' Church in 1760. On Christian Gedde's map of the West Quarter, he is mentioned as the proprietor of Stormgade No. 296 (now demolished). His wife died on 20 September 1891. On 22 March 1783, he wed Kirstine Jacobsdatter Sandberg (c. 1734–1808). They had four foster children. They are in a will mentioned as siblings and the fact that two of them have the same given names as Cronberg's parents indicate that they may have been the biological children of one of his brothers or sisters. Kristine Sandberg Cronberg continued the distillery following her husband's death from a stroke in 1786.

Kristine Sandberg Cronberg shared the property with a substantial number of tenants. At the time of the 1787 census, the property was thus home to a total of 31 people, distributed among nine households, ranging from a court painter  and a Jewish commissioner to two women who made a living from dressing corpses.

19th century
At the time of the 1801 census, No. 5 was home to a total of 43 people distributed among 12 households. Kirstine Cronberg, the owner of the property, lived there with a maid but was no longer involved in the management of the distillery. Rasmus Thonnum, a brandy maker, resided in the building with his wife Ane Cathrine Pedersen, their two children (aged 10 and 12), one maid and one distillery worker.  Rasmus Pedersen, a tailor, resided in the building with his wife Elisabeth Lykke and two children (aged five and eight). Bernt Haverin, a shoemaker, resided in the building with his wife Marie Cathrine Holmberg and their three-year-old grandson Johan Friderich Holmstrøm. Hans Christophersen, a 54-year-old former soldier, resided in the building with his wife Karen Marie Christophersen, their two children (aged 19 and 24) and three lodgers. Hans Magnussen, a fishmonger, resided in the building with his wife Lovise Olsen and their two daughters (aged four and six). Johan Beauvent, a pensioner, resided in the building with his wife Dorthea Gierling and their 28-year-old son Johan Jacob Beauvent. Jørgen Sigismund Jørgensen, a mate, resided in the building with his wife Jacobine Vandrup, their three children (aged two to seven), his brother Peter Wilhelm Jørgensen (a building painter) and two maids. Frideriche Vadskier, a 47-year-old widow with a pension, resided in the building with a maid. Hans Jensen, a beer vendor, resided in the building with his wife Hans Jensen, their three-year-old daughter and a lodger.

Kristine Cronberg's property was listed in the new cadastre of 1806 as in Snaren's Quarter. She remained the owner until her death in 1808.

1840 census

The property was home to 43 residents at the time of the 1840 census. The building in Nybrogade was home to 21 of them. Ane Dorthea Meier (née Hornbech), widow of merchant (grosserer) F. D. Meier, her daughter Emma Christiane Meier and one maid. Lovise Hendrichsen, a widow bookseller (paper merchant), resided on the first floor with two unmarried daughters (aged 34 and36), an employee, an apprentice and a maid. Kerstine Fischer, another widow, resided on the second floor with her four children (aged seven to 14) and one maid. Johan Henrich Holm, a carpenter, resided in the basement to the right with his wife Jacobine Jacobsen, their two children (aged three and six), his mother Else Kerstine Engermann and his sister Sophie Karoline Holm. The remaining 22 residents resided in the building in Snaregade. Johan Paulus Thiel, a master coppersmith (frimester), resided in the basement to the right with his wife Helene Sinsted and their two children (aged 25 and 27). Helene Bolette Norstrøm, a widow employed with needlework, resided in the basement to the left with her three children (aged 15 to 24) and the one-year-old boy Ernst August Lans. Hans Chrestian Hansen, a master shoemaker, resided on the ground floor to the right with his wife Marie Lisabeth Berttelsen. Carl Wilhelm Carlsen, a musician, resided on the first floor to the right with his wife Enger Ingerborg Chrestesen	and the mailman Niels Chrestesen. Ane Frederikke Krause (née Azsellund), a widow employed with needlework, resided on the first floor to the left with two unmarried children (aged 22 and 23) and the 30-year-old master shoemaker Gothef Fredrich Tesch. Jørgen Petersen, a saddler (saddelmagersvend) at Tøjhuset, resided on the second floor to the right with his wife Karen Mardelene Fengt. Niels Bruun, a tobacco spinner, resided on the second floor to the left with his wife Johan Marie Langebech.

Later history
The politician Balthazar Christensen (1802–1882) resided in one of the apartments from 1850 to 1855. He had been one of the founders of the Society of the Friends of Peasants and was its president from 1848 to 1858. August Bournonville (1805–1879) was among the residents in 1868–1869. His next home was at Nyhavn 63.

Architecture

Nybrogade 8
 
Nybrogade is constructed with four storeys over a walk-out basement with a four-bay perpendicular side wing extending from the northern part of its rear side. The building is five bays wide of which the three central ones form a slightly projecting median risalit. The front is constructed in brick, rendered in a colour reminiscent of Nexø on the ground floor and a pale red colour on the upper floors, with brown-painted windows. The main entrance furthest to the right (south) is accessed via a short flight of granite steps and topped by a hood mould. The door is a brown-painted wooden door with transom window. In the other side of the building is a cellar entrance with cast iron railings shaped as griffons. The windows on the two upper floors are taller than the ones on the upper ones.

 
A stone tablet with an inscription is embedded in the wall above the central window on the ground floor, the year 1732 indicating that it dates from the previous building on the spot. The facade is finished by a white-painted cornice. The red tile roof is pierced by a substantial brick chimney. The four-bay side wing is topped by a monopitched red tile roof pierced by another chimney.

The rear side of the building is constructed with timber framing, brown-painted with yellow infills, standing on a black-painted granite plinth. The third floor is slightly inset, has a different rhythm in the timber framing and different windows, heralding that the building was expanded in 1843.

Snaregade 5
 
Snaregade 5 is a timber-framed structure, with black-painted beams and infills of undressed brick, standing on a plinth of black painted granite ashlars. It consists of three storeys over a raised cellar towards the street and with two two-storey side wings on its rear. The front side is seven bays wide, of which the central bay with the main entrance is wider than the other bays. The facade is finished by a white-painted cornice. The ridged roof is clad with red tile.

The rear side of the building, with brown-painted beams and yellow infills, features a five-bay gabled wall dormer which continues into the roof of the southern side wing. It has a door with transom window in the centre and a cellar entrance furthest to the north.

The northern side wing is four bays long and topped by a monopitched, red tile roof. The timber framing is again painted brown but the infills are painted red. It features two cellar entrances. The southern side wing is just two bays long and again topped by a monopitched red tile roof. The timber framing is brown-painted and the infills are yellow.

Today
The property is divided into condominiums and is jointly owned by the owners via E/F Nybrogade 8. The basement of Nybrogade 8 contains a 91-square metre retail space. The basement of Snaregade 5 is also a retail space.

Gallery

References

External links
 
 Nybrogade 8

Listed residential buildings in Copenhagen
Timber framed buildings in Copenhagen
Buildings and structures completed in 1732
Buildings and structures completed in 1768